GCSU or Georgia College & State University is a public university in Milledgeville, Georgia.

GCSU may also refer to:
 GCSU Sri Lanka, the Government Clerical Service Union in Sri Lanka.
 Grenfell Campus Student Union, the students' union for the Grenfell Campus of Memorial University in Corner Brook, Newfoundland and Labrador.
 Glendon College Student Union, the students' union for the Glendon College campus of York University in Toronto, Ontario.